Baitada or Baitadeli also Soradi is referred to the people of Baitadi district, of Nepal  and also  one of the dialect of Kumaoni language spoken in the Baitadi District of Nepal or similar language spoken in other area like Darchula,  Bhajhang, Dadeldhura, kanchanpur and kailali Districts  of Nepal. Large number of population originally from Baitadi  living in the adjoining area of Pithoragarh District of Uttarakhand, India like Dharchula, Baluwakot, Askot, Jauljibi, Dauda, Sunkholi, Jhulaghat, Pipali etc. also speaks the same dialects  which G. A. Grierson has mentioned as the dialects of Kumaoni language. Current census (2011) has revealed that in Nepal  2,72,524 numbers of people speak Baitadeli (Baitada) dialect.

Sources
History of Nepal by Bal Chandra Sharma
History of Kumaoun By B.D. Pandey
 https://web.archive.org/web/20130418000000/http://cbs.gov.np/wp-content/uploads/2012/11/National%20Report.pdf

Ethnic groups in Nepal